The Panchatantra is an ancient Sanskrit collection of stories, probably first composed around 300 CE (give or take a century or two), though some of its component stories may be much older. The original text is not extant, but the work has been widely revised and translated such that there exist "over 200 versions in more than 50 languages." The actual content of these versions sometimes differs greatly.

The lists of stories in a few notable versions are compared below.

Key 

 A-T — Aarne–Thompson tale type index number.
 Edge — Franklin Edgerton's 1924 reconstruction of the Sanskrit text of the original Panchatantra. Though scholars debate details of his text, its list of stories can be considered definitive. It is the basis of English translations by Edgerton himself (1924) and Patrick Olivelle (1997 & 2006). The content of 2 other important versions, the "Southern" Panchatantra and the Tantrākhyāyika are very similar to that of Edgerton's reconstruction.
 Durg — Durgasimha's Kannada translation of c. 1031 CE is one of the earliest extant translations into an Indian vernacular.
 Soma — Somadeva's Kathasaritsagara ("Ocean of Streams of Story") of 1070 is a massive collection of stories and legends, to which a version of the Panchatantra contributes roughly half of Book 10. The numbers given are those of N. M. Penzer, which situate the Panchatantra passages within the Kathasaritsagara as a whole. At the end of each of the Panchatantra's books, Somadeva (or his source) adds a number of unrelated stories, "usually of the 'noodle' variety."
 Purn — Purnabhadra's recension of 1199 CE is one of the longest Sanskrit versions, and is the basis of both Arthur W. Ryder's English translation of 1925, and Chandra Rajan's of 1993.
 Nara — Hitopadesha by Narayana is probably the most popular version in India, and was the second work ever translated from Sanskrit into English (by Charles Wilkins in 1787). The Hitopadesha itself exists in several versions, without an extant original. However, in this case the differences are comparatively trivial. Narayana split, combined, and reordered his source stories more extensively than most other revisers of the Panchatantra, so while cells in other columns generally have a one-to-one relationship, this does not hold true for the Hitopadesha.

Table 

In addition to the stories listed below, many versions begin with a prelude in which a king bewails the stupidity of his sons, and the wise Vishnu Sharma (the Panchatantra's reputed author) bets that he can teach them statecraft in a mere 6 months; the tales constitute his lesson. (Of the versions tabulated below, only Somadeva's Kathasaritsagara lacks this "master frame" — an unsurprising omission, since the Panchatantra section is placed within the "master frame" of the Kathasaritsagara itself.)

Notes

References
 (New Kannada translation of Durgasimha's Halegannada Panchatantra)

Sanskrit literature
Lists of stories
Indian literature-related lists
Storytelling
Ancient Indian literature
Fables
Indian folklore